The Garibaldi Battalion (Garibaldi Brigade after April 1937) was a largely-Italian volunteer unit of the International Brigades that fought on the Republican side of the Spanish Civil War from October 1936 to 1938. It was named after Giuseppe Garibaldi, an Italian military and political figure of the nineteenth century.

History
The Italian Legion was established on 27 October 1936, through an agreement signed in Paris between Italian republicans, socialists and Communists. It was headed by the Republican commander Randolfo Pacciardi and Communist political commissars Antonio Roasio, Luigi Longo and socialist Amedeo  Azzi. It was part of the XII International Brigade along with André Marty Battalion and Dimitrov Battalion. It had a baptism of fire on the November 13, 1936 at Cerro de los Ángeles during the Siege of Madrid, then the battalion fought by the University of Madrid, at Pozuelo, Boadilla del Monte, Mirabueno, Majadahonda and Jarama. During the Battle of Jarama, Pacciardi was wounded, and so Ilio Barontini took command of the battalion during the Battle of Guadalajara. Pacciardi was again the commander at Huesca and Villanueva del Pardillo.

In late of April 1937, it was dissolved to form the skeleton of the Garibaldi Brigade, formally established on May 1. Brigade was strengthened by the arrival of the soldiers of Dimitrov battalion and by the volunteers of the dissolved Italian column, and other Italian groups from other formations and many others new volunteers who continue to turn to Spain. The Garibaldi Brigade remained part of the XII International Brigade, under the direction of Randolfo Pacciardi until August 1937; it consisted of four battalions. Then there were five commanders until its dissolution on September 24, 1938. In addition to operations in the north of the current Community of Madrid and parts of Aragon, it played its most prominent role in the Battle of the Ebro.

Mehmet Shehu, future Prime Minister of Albania, was among the volunteers. Other notable Albanian members include Veli Dedi, Petro Marko, Shaban Basha, Thimjo Gogozoto and Asim Vokshi, one of the staff officers of the battalion.

Personnel
Amedeo Azzi – political commissar
Shaban Basha
Ilio Barontini
Veli Dedi
Thimjo Gogozoto
Luigi Longo
Petro Marko
Randolfo Pacciardi – commander
Antonio Roasio
Mehmet Shehu
Asim Vokshi

Bibliography
 Luigi Arbizzani, P. Mondini Garibaldini in Spagna e nella Resistenza bolognese, Quaderni de "La Lotta", 1966
 Sandro Attanasio, Gli italiani e la guerra di Spagna, Mursia
 Giacomo Calandrone, La Spagna brucia: cronache garibaldine, Roma, Editori Riuniti
 Giulia Canali,  L'antifascismo italiano e la guerra civile spagnola, Manni
 Aldo Garosci, Gli intellettuali e la guerra di Spagna ,  Milano, Einaudi, 1959 
 Aldo Garosci, Umberto Marzocchi, Carlo Rosselli, Giustizia e libertà nella lotta antifascista e nella storia d'Italia, La Nuova Italia, 1978
 Luigi Longo, Le brigate internazionali in Spagna, Roma, Editori Riuniti,  1956
 Randolfo Pacciardi, Il battaglione Garibaldi, Lugano 1938.
 Giovanni Pesce, Senza tregua, Milano, Feltrinelli, 1973
 Carlo Rosselli, Oggi in Spagna domani in Italia, Milano, Einaudi, 1967

References

International Brigades
Military units and formations established in 1937
Military units and formations disestablished in 1938
Anti-fascism in Italy
Giuseppe Garibaldi